Diagnosis: Murder eighth and final season originally aired from October 12, 2000, to May 11, 2001.

Cast
Dick Van Dyke as Dr. Mark Sloan
Victoria Rowell as Dr. Amanda Bentley
Charlie Schlatter as Dr. Jesse Travis
Barry Van Dyke as Steve Sloan

Episodes

References

2000 American television seasons

Diagnosis: Murder seasons
2001 American television seasons